Boundiali Tehini Airport  is an airport serving Boundiali, Côte d'Ivoire.

See also
Transport in Côte d'Ivoire

References

 OurAirports - Boundiali
   Great Circle Mapper - Boundiali
 Google Earth

Airports in Ivory Coast
Buildings and structures in Savanes District
Bagoué